The Gibb River Road is a road in the Kimberley region of Western Australia.

Description
The road is a former cattle route that stretches in an east–west direction almost  through the Kimberley between the towns of Derby and the Kununurra and Wyndham junction of the Great Northern Highway. The Gibb River Road is one of the two major roads which dissect the Kimberley region—the other being the extreme northern section of Great Northern Highway which runs further to the south.

The road is often closed due to flooding during the wet season, which is typically November through March, although delayed openings have been known to happen, frustrating the tourism industry as well as locals who rely on the road.  Since the mid-2000s, the road has been upgraded to a formed gravel two-lane road including a few short bitumenised sections, but 4WD vehicles are still recommended due to the water crossings and numerous heavily corrugated sections.

The Gibb River Road has scenic views of geological formations and natural scenery, Aboriginal and pastoral history, as well as rare and unique fauna and flora.  Attractions along the road include Windjana Gorge National Park, Tunnel Creek National Park, Adcock Gorge, Manning Gorge, Galvans Gorge, Lennard Gorge, Bell Gorge, and Wunaamin Miliwundi Ranges.  Accommodation is offered by several cattle stations in the area including Mount Hart Wilderness Lodge, Mount Barnett Station, Mount Elizabeth Station, Drysdale River Station, the El Questro Station, Ellenbrae and Charnley River Station.

History
From 1948, an Air Beef Scheme operated between Glenroy Station and Wyndham.  An abattoir, freezing works, and airstrip were built on the station and the meat airfreighted twice a day to the coast before being shipped to the southern cities. To develop the beef industry further, a Commonwealth Government grant to build a road was given in 1949 and the following year construction of a road to Derby commenced, one of a number of roads built as part of the so-called "Beef Roads Scheme".  This southern section, which is sometimes referred to as the Derby-Gibb River Road, was completed in 1956 at a cost of £713,677 and was used for trucking live cattle.

The northern section of the road was under the control of the Shire of Wyndham-East Kimberley until 1996 when Main Roads Western Australia took over control and upgraded the full length of the highway.

Native title

A joint native title claim, known as the Dambimangari claim and covering a large area of the Kimberley, was lodged in 1998 by the Wanjina-Wunggurr (Native Title) Aboriginal Corporation RNTBC on behalf of three peoples, the Worrorra of Dambimangari, the Wunambal Gaambera of Uunguu, and the Ngarinyin of Wilinggin. The Wilinggin portion of the claim, covering an area of more than  along the Gibb River Road, was the first of the three to be determined for the Ngarinyin people, by litigation on 27 August 2004.

See also

Footnotes

References

Further reading
 Gordon, Malcolm (1991) Gibb River Road - history of the road, road conditions, features along the road, roadhouses etc.at page 425 of  Gordon, Malcolm. Outback Australia at cost : a traveller's guide to the Northern Territory and Kimberley Crows Nest, N.S.W : Little Hills Press.  (pbk.)
 Hayden, Vanessa. (1998) KTA AGM addresses Gibb River Road concerns. (summary) Local tourism operators call for better management of the Road due to perception usage has reached 'saturation point' and is losing its wilderness appeal due to overuse. Kimberley Echo, 5 November 1998, p. 9 
 Knapinski, Ben.(2001) Kimberley, Western Australia's Gibb River road Bunbury, W.A. : Envisage Publishing.  (pbk.)

External links
 
 Includes links to many other sites,  including warnings alerts and road conditions, accommodation, etc.

Australian outback tracks
Kimberley (Western Australia)
Roads in Western Australia